Tereje Wodajo (born 27 January 1982) is an Ethiopian long-distance runner. He competed in the men's marathon at the 2004 Summer Olympics.

References

External links
 

1982 births
Living people
Athletes (track and field) at the 2004 Summer Olympics
Ethiopian male long-distance runners
Ethiopian male marathon runners
Olympic athletes of Ethiopia
Place of birth missing (living people)
20th-century Ethiopian people
21st-century Ethiopian people